The New Generation Party is a conservative political party in Costa Rica. The party was founded in 2012 in order to partake in the 2014 general election.

In the 2014 election its nominee was party's founder Sergio Mena, former councilor of Montes de Oca municipal council and president of this. Mena was also first in parliamentary list, but the party did not earn enough votes to enter Parliament and Mena himself received 1.2% of the presidential ticket.

Yet, in the following 2016 mid-term municipal elections, the party won three cantons therefore electing three mayors and many councilors, and placed in fourth after some of Costa Rica's major parties like PLN, PAC and PUSC. Most of the party's candidates though were already well known political figures rejected by their original parties. It's currently under talks for a nation-wide multi-party coalition with different conservative parties.

Ideology
Originally having a more liberal approach in favor of such topics like church-state separation and same-sex unions, the party switched to the more conservative side. In the second round of the 2018 Costa Rican general election Mena endorsed conservative candidate Fabricio Alvarado. Mena also took part of the anti-immigration rally organized in August 2018 and in late of the same year expressed in an interview that "Progres [progressives] only know how to insult and offend". He's also on talks with several minor right-wing conservative parties for a coalition in the next election. In April 2019 its National Congress officially proclaimed the party as "center-right" and adhered to conservative positions officially rejecting abortion and same-sex marriage.

In September 2020 it received the adhesion of independent deputy Erick Rodríguez Steller, controversial figure due to his positions on immigrants and LGBT people. However, by regulations, he continues to serve as an independent legislator and the New Generation Party is not recognized as a fraction of the legislative body.

Electoral performance

Presidential

Parliamentary

External links
Official Website

References

2012 establishments in Costa Rica
Conservative parties in Costa Rica
Liberal parties in Costa Rica
Political parties established in 2012
Political parties in Costa Rica
Social conservative parties